Tracey Greenwood is a professional fitness competitor on the IFBB circuit.

Biography 
Tracey became interested in fitness and bodybuilding during high school.  Tracey would buy copies of Muscle & Fitness and would see pictures of early bodybuilders such as Cory Everson, Tonya Knight, and Rachel McLish.  These early pioneers of female bodybuilding inspired Tracey and she decided to pursue her dream of becoming a fitness competitor.  She started training in her senior year of high school, but didn't become serious until college.  She won her first contest as an amateur in 1997 at the Europa Fitness Championships.  Tracey continued competing as an amateur until 2001 when she took second place at the NPC USA Championships thus earning her Pro Card.

Aside from competing as an IFBB professional, Tracey also trains aspiring athletes for figure and fitness competition.  She sponsors her own NPC contest (Tracey Greenwood Fitness and Figure Classic) and is a judge at the NPC state level.  She earned a B.S. in exercise physiology from the University of Delaware in 1991 and a M.S. in health education from Saint Joseph's University in 1996.  She possesses a Ph.D. in exercise physiology at Temple University.  She also volunteers time for the animal rescue Adopt a Boxer Rescue.

Contest history 
1997 Pittsburgh NPC Fitness Championships – 4th
1997 Europa NPC Fitness Championships – 1st
1998 New Jersey Gold's Classic – 1st
1999 North American Championships  – 3rd
2000 NPC USA Championships – 9th
2000 Team Universe Championships – 5th
2000 NPC Pittsburgh Amateur – Overall champion
2000 NPC National Championships – 4th
2001 NPC USA Championships – 2nd (earned Pro Card)
2002 IFBB Southwest Pro – 9th
2002 IFBB Atlantic States – 9th
2002  Carl van Vechten Fitness Championships – 19th
2002  Jan Tana Classic (now defunct) – 3rd
2002 Fitness Olympia – 7th
2003 Fitness International – 6th
2003 Night of Fitness – 5th
2003  Jan Tana Classic (now defunct) – 1st
2003 Fitness Olympia – 4th
2003 GNC Show of Strength – 6th
2004 Fitness Olympia 5th
2005 Europa Supershow Champion
2005 Fitness Olympia – 4th
2005  Bulk Nutrition – 2nd place
2006 Fitness Olympia – 5th
2007 Fitness International – 6th
2007 New York Pro – 1st
2007 Atlantic City Pro – 1st
2008 Europa Supershow Champion

External links 

 Tracey Greenwood

Living people
Fitness and figure competitors
Saint Joseph's University alumni
Year of birth missing (living people)